The State Treasurer's Office is responsible for several administrative and service duties, in accordance with Vermont Statutes.  These include: investing state funds; issuing state bonds; serving as the central bank for state agencies; managing the state's cash balances, check processing and reconciliation; safeguarding and returning unclaimed or abandoned financial property; and administering three major pension plans for public employees. The Treasurer is fifth (behind the Lieutenant Governor, Speaker of the House of Representatives, President pro tempore of the Senate, and Secretary of State, respectively) in the line of succession to the office of Governor of Vermont.

The incumbent is Mike Pieciak who assumed in the office in January 2023. He succeeded Beth Pearce, who was appointed to the office in January, 2011 when Jeb Spaulding resigned to become Secretary of Administration in the cabinet of Governor Peter Shumlin, and has been subsequently elected.  Pearce had been Spaulding's deputy.

List of Vermont State Treasurers (1778–present)

Notes

State treasurers of Vermont